The Pope Smokes Dope is the third album by David Peel and the Lower East Side, released on April 17, 1972 through Apple Records.

History
Peel, along with John Lennon and Yoko Ono, performed Peel's "The Ballad of New York", on The David Frost Show, with Lennon playing tea-chest bass. The trio, joined by The Lower East Side Band, played several songs by Lennon and Ono. This episode was recorded on December 16, 1971 and broadcast on January 13, 1972.

The album was released on April 17, 1972.

The CD was released in 2005 by Orange Records International.

Track listing 

	

Bonus tracks on CD edition
"Amerika" (Edit) – 4:15
with Yoko Ono
"How Did You Meet David Peel?" – 2:07
interview with John Lennon
"Everybody's Smokin'" (Remix) – 7:41

Chart positions

Personnel 
Bagtwo (Jeffery Levy) – design, artwork
Roy Cicala – engineering
Jack Douglas – engineering
Bill Ferrara – photography
Robert L. Heimall – art direction
Allan Steckler - production supervision
John Lennon – production, voice (tracks 6 & 12), backing vocals (12)
Yoko Ono – production, percussions (track 1), voice (6)
David Peel – vocals, guitar
Eddie Mottau – guitar
Chris Osborne – guitar
Charlie Wolff – guitar
Eddie Ryan – drums
The Lower East Side Friends – chorus
Tom Doyle – guitar, backing vocals
Bruce Bierman – backing vocals
John Robertson – guitar
Billy Minelli – bass
Frank Lanci – drums
Lenny Mars – harp (tracks 4 & 7), flutes (1,4,6 & 8), piano (7), percussions (1, 8 & 10), banjo (1, 4 & 7), mandolin (7 & 10)

References

External links 
 

1972 albums
David Peel (musician) albums
Albums produced by John Lennon
Albums produced by Yoko Ono
Apple Records albums